Edifier is the fifth studio album by Gravitar, released in 2001 by Manifold Records.

Track listing

Personnel 
Adapted from the Edifier liner notes.

Gravitar
 Eric Cook – drums, editing, mastering
 Geoff Walker – vocals, electric guitar, horns, piano (4), cover art
 Michael J. Walker – electric guitar, acoustic guitar, piano (3)

Production and additional personnel
 John D'Agostini – editing, mastering
 Geoff Streadwick – recording, mixing, organ (2, 4), guitar (2, 4)

Release history

References

External links 
 Edifier at Discogs (list of releases)

2001 albums
Gravitar (band) albums